The Minister of Agriculture (formerly the Minister of Agriculture and Resource Development) is a cabinet minister in the province of Manitoba, Canada, responsible for Manitoba Agriculture. The ministry oversees provincial government activity in agriculture, agri-food, and the agri-product sector, as well as natural resource development.

The current Minister of Agriculture is  Derek Johnson of the Progressive Conservatives.

History
Some changes in the ministerial responsibilities have resulted in change to the name of the ministry. Manitoba Agriculture, Food and Rural Initiatives (MAFRI), was created on 4 November 2003 when the Department of Agriculture and Food was merged with Rural Initiatives and Cooperative Development (both from the Department of Intergovernmental Affairs). On 3 May 2016, the Pallister government renamed the cabinet position as the "Minister of Agriculture".

In late 2019, oversight of the agriculture portfolio merged with that of natural resource development and sustainable development, thereby forming the new Ministry of Agriculture and Resource Development. Like, the remaining economic development and business portfolios of Growth, Enterprise and Trade formed the new Ministry of Economic Development and Training.

References

External links
Manitoba Agriculture, Food and Rural Initiatives

Agriculture and Resource Development, Minister of
Manitoba
Minister_of_Agriculture